The 2013–14 Wagner Seahawks men's basketball team represented Wagner College during the 2013–14 NCAA Division I men's basketball season. The Seahawks were led by second year head coach Bashir Mason. They played their home games at Spiro Sports Center and were members of the Northeast Conference. They finished the season at 19–12 overall and 12–4 in conference play, for a second-place finish. Wagner defeated Central Connecticut in the NEC tournament quarterfinals before losing to Mount St. Mary's in the semifinals.

Roster

Schedule

|-
!colspan=9 style="background:#004236; color:#CCCCCC;"| Regular season

|-
!colspan=9 style="background:#004236; color:#CCCCCC;"| 2014 Northeast Conference tournament

* Due to inclement weather in the Northeast, January 4's game vs. Wagner was canceled.

References 

Wagner Seahawks men's basketball seasons
Wagner